The Lynde Point Light or Lynde Point Lighthouse, also known as Saybrook Inner Lighthouse, is a lighthouse in  Connecticut, United States, on the west side of the mouth of the Connecticut River on the Long Island Sound, Old Saybrook, Connecticut. The first light was a  wooden tower constructed by Abisha Woodward for $2,200 and it was completed in 1803. A new lighthouse was eventually needed and a total of $7,500 was appropriated on July 7, 1838. Jonathan Scranton, Volney Pierce, and John Wilcox were contracted to build the new  octagonal brownstone tower. It was constructed in 1838 and lit in 1839. The lighthouse was renovated in 1867 and had its keeper's house from 1833 replaced in 1858 with a Gothic Revival gambrel-roofed wood-frame house. In 1966, the house was torn down and replaced by a duplex house. The original ten lamps were replaced in 1852 with a fourth-order Fresnel lens, and with a fifth-order Fresnel lens in 1890. Lynde Point Lighthouse used whale oil until 1879 when it switched to kerosene. It was electrified in 1955 and fully automated by the United States Coast Guard in 1978. In 1990, it was added to the National Register of Historic Places and is significant for its "superior stone work in the tapering brownstone walls".

First light
Out of a need for a lighthouse to mark the Old Saybrook harbor, the government paid $225 for William Lynde's land at its entrance to erect a light. Abisha Woodward was contracted to build a  wooden tower for $2,200 and it was completed in 1803. Due to erosion threatening the foundation of the lighthouse, a seawall was constructed in 1829, and it was reinforced and widened in 1831. Also constructed was a six-room frame structure to serve as the keeper's quarters.  The keeper's building was replaced in 1933. The light was criticized by many sailors for being too short to be seen at an effective distance, a problem exacerbated by a local fog from the marshland that obscured the light. A petition was made to have the tower raised , but it was deemed a replacement would be better.

Current light 
The United States Congress appropriated funds for the tower's replacement by 1832. On July 7, 1838, Congress appropriated an additional $2,500.00 to add to the other $5,000.00 appropriated for the new lighthouse. The contract for the lighthouse was awarded to Jonathan Scranton, Volney Pierce, and John Wilcox of Madison, Connecticut, on August 18, 1838. A new  octagonal brownstone tower was constructed in 1838 and lit in 1839. The lighthouse is painted white and has six windows, all facing the water. The lighthouse has been described as being "similar to the masonry towers built earlier, (New London Harbor Light, New Haven Harbor (Five Mile Point) Light, and Faulkner's Island Light), but Lynde Point is considered to represent the finest work of the three". The wooden staircase was likely replaced in an 1868 renovation of the light. In 1886, the Saybrook Breakwater Light was built. Lynde Point then became commonly known as the "Saybrook Inner Light" and Saybrook Breakwater became known as the "Saybrook Outer Light".

The keeper's house from 1833 had a frame kitchen addition that connected to the lighthouse, but it was replaced in 1858 with a Gothic Revival gambrel-roofed wood-frame house. In 1966, the house was torn down and replaced by a duplex house. In 1852, a fourth-order Fresnel lens from Barbler and Fenestre replaced the original ten lamps and  reflectors. In 1890, a fifth-order Fresnel lens, which is still in the tower today, was installed. An appropriation of $800 was made for a fog bell in 1850, and it was installed in 1854 at a cost of $1000. Two years later the machinery to automatically strike the fog bell was completed. The 1867 renovation saw the addition of a fog siren, but it was removed and replaced with the fog bell in 1874 and a new fog bell was later installed in 1883. Lynde Point Lighthouse used whale oil until 1879 when it switched to kerosene, it was electrified in 1955 and fully automated by the United States Coast Guard in 1978.

Importance 
In 1990, it was added to the National Register of Historic Places. Templeton writes, "Lynde Point exhibits superior stone work in the tapering brownstone walls. Of the three early masonry Lighttowers in the nominated group, Lynde Point is the latest and its construction is the best documented: two advertisements for construction proposals survive, containing the government's specifications, and the construction contract as well. Lynde Point also is significant as part of the federal government's early efforts to improve aids to navigation in Long Island Sound, when the mouths of important harbors and rivers were among the first sites chosen for lighthouse appropriations." Lynde Point is an active aid to navigation and is not open to the public. The Lynde Point Light was used in the 2005 horror movie Predator Island.

List of keepers 
This list includes known keepers, but excludes assistants and non-officers of the Coast Guard.

See also 

 List of lighthouses in Connecticut
 List of lighthouses in the United States
 National Register of Historic Places listings in Middlesex County, Connecticut

References

External links

Lighthouses completed in 1803
Towers completed in 1803
Lighthouses completed in 1838
Old Saybrook, Connecticut
Long Island Sound
Lighthouses on the National Register of Historic Places in Connecticut
Transportation buildings and structures in Middlesex County, Connecticut
National Register of Historic Places in Middlesex County, Connecticut
1803 establishments in Connecticut